Matua is a genus of South Pacific ground spiders that was first described by Raymond Robert Forster in 1979.  it contains only two species, both found in New Zealand: M. festiva and M. valida.

References

Araneomorphae genera
Gnaphosidae
Taxa named by Raymond Robert Forster